Bulat (Bashkir and ) is a rural locality (a village) in Bishkurayevsky Selsoviet, Tuymazinsky District, Bashkortostan, Russia. The population was 266 as of 2010. There are 2 streets.

Geography 
Bulat is located 35 km east of Tuymazy (the district's administrative centre) by road. Tuktagulovo is the nearest rural locality.

References 

Rural localities in Tuymazinsky District